Herman Hall (June 6, 1864 – September 6, 1928) was a United States Army officer in the late 19th and early 20th centuries. He served in several conflicts, including World War I.

Biography
Hall was born on June 6, 1864, in Carthage, Illinois. He graduated from the United States Military Academy in 1887.

Hall was commissioned into the 4th Infantry Regiment. After doing frontier duty, he went to Cuba because of the Spanish–American War, serving in the Sanitary Corps. Afterward, Hall went to the Philippines because of the Philippine–American War, and he received a Silver Star while there. He served as the chief of the Philippine Constabulary from 1915 to 1917.

Hall was promoted to the rank of brigadier general on August 5, 1917. He served as the temporary commander of the 80th Division from August 27 to September 9, 1917, and he commanded several infantry brigades in France. He also served in Germany. From 1919 to 1920, he commanded the 19th Infantry Regiment.

Hall retired on October 23, 1923, at his permanent rank of colonel. Living in Santa Barbara, California, Hall died on September 6, 1928. Congress restored his brigadier general rank in June 1930.

Personal life
Hall married Anna Grace Jack on October 18, 1893.

References

Bibliography

1864 births
1928 deaths
People from Carthage, Illinois
People from Santa Barbara, California
American military personnel of the Spanish–American War
United States Army generals of World War I
United States Army generals
Recipients of the Silver Star
United States Military Academy alumni
Military personnel from California
Military personnel from Illinois